The 1986 Hi-Tec British Open Championships was held at the Dunnings Mill Squash Club in East Grinstead and the Wembley Conference Centre in London from 14–22 April 1986. Jahangir Khan won his fifth consecutive title defeating Ross Norman in the final.

Seeds

Draw and results

Final
 Jahangir Khan beat  Ross Norman 9-6 9-4 9-6

Section 1

Section 2

Glen Brumby (seeded 9) withdrew before the tournament and was replaced by Mohamed Awad

References

Men's British Open Squash Championships
Men's British Open Championship
Men's British Open Squash Championship
Men's British Open Squash
Men's British Open Squash Championship
Squash competitions in London